Aglaia amplexicaulis is a species of tree in the family Meliaceae,  endemic to Fiji.

References

Endemic flora of Fiji
amplexicaulis
Vulnerable plants
Taxonomy articles created by Polbot